Pleurostigmomorpha is a subclass of centipedes, containing all the orders except Scutigeromorpha. It contains 4 orders, which are subsequently divided into 15 families, 363 genera, and 3104 species. 

The following physical and developmental traits can be used to separate members of the Pleurostigmomorpha from Notostigmomorpha:

 The spiracles are located on the sides of the centipede.
 The spiracles are deep, more complex, and always present in pairs.
 The head is somewhat flatter.
 The centipedes can develop through either anamorphosis or epimorphosis.

A 2022 paper reported that "Lithobiomorpha is the earliest diverging clade while the order Scolopendromorpha and the order Geophilomorpha cluster into one clade."

References 

Centipedes
Subclasses (biology)